Viking is a given name which may refer to:

 Viking (Norse mythology), father of Thorstein, from Þorsteins saga Víkingssonar
 Viking Björk (1918–2009), Swedish cardiac surgeon
 Viking Dahl, (1895–1945), Swedish composer, as well as a painter and author
 Viking Eggeling (1880–1925), Swedish avant-garde artist and filmmaker
 Viking Palm (1923–2009), Swedish wrestler and 1952 Olympic champion

See also
Viking (nickname)